Sir Harry Chapman Sinderson (9 June 1891 – 20 November 1974) was an English medical doctor. He was Doctor to the royal family of Iraq in the period (1923–1946), and founder and first Dean of the College of Medicine University of Baghdad in 1927.

Biography 
Born in Caister, Lincolnshire, Sinderson graduated from the Faculty of Medicine, University of Edinburgh in 1914. He participated in World War I as an army Doctor. He was posted to Iraq in 1918, and was seconded to the British administration as Deputy Director of Civil Medical Services.  In 1919 and 1920, he worked as a surgeon in Hillah and Baghdad, and later was in charge of various hospitals in Baghdad.  In 1927, he helped to establish a new medical school in Baghdad, which became the Royal Medical College when the King opened its new building in 1930.  From 1923, Sinderson was personal physician to Iraq’s Kings.  He served as Dean of the Medical College from 1927 until 1934, and again from 1941 until 1946, when he retired and returned to live in Sussex, England.

Sources 

Sinderson, H.C. Ten Thousand and One Nights. 1973. Hodder & Stoughton

20th-century English medical doctors
1891 births
1974 deaths
British expatriates in Iraq